Myles-Mills is a surname. Notable people with the surname include:

John Myles-Mills (born 1966), Ghanaian sprinter
Leonard Myles-Mills (born 1973), Ghanaian sprinter and brother of John

See also
Mills (surname)
Myles (given name)
Myles (surname)

Compound surnames